Homovanillic acid (HVA) is a major catecholamine metabolite that is produced by a consecutive action of monoamine oxidase and catechol-O-methyltransferase on dopamine. Homovanillic acid is used as a reagent to detect oxidative enzymes, and is associated with dopamine levels in the brain.

In psychiatry and neuroscience, brain and cerebrospinal fluid levels of HVA are measured as a marker of metabolic stress caused by 2-deoxy-D-glucose.  HVA presence supports a diagnosis of neuroblastoma and malignant pheochromocytoma.

Fasting plasma levels of HVA are known to be higher in females than in males. This does not seem to be influenced by adult hormonal changes, as the pattern is retained in the elderly and post-menopausal as well as transgender people according to their genetic sex, both before and during cross-sex hormone administration.  Differences in HVA have also been correlated to tobacco usage, with smokers showing significantly lower amounts of plasma HVA.

See also 
 Homovanillyl alcohol

References 

Vanilloids
Acetic acids
Neurochemistry
Phenolic human metabolites
O-methylated phenols